Metropolitans 92 is a French professional basketball club that is based in Levallois-Perret, in the Paris metropolitan area. The club currently plays in the LNB Pro A, the highest-tier level in French basketball.

The club was established in 2007, as  Paris-Levallois Basket.  Its home arena is the Palais des sports Marcel Cerdan, which has a seating capacity of 4,000 people. Levallois has won two titles thus far, winning the French Federation Cup and the Match des Champions (French Supercup), both in 2013.

History
Named after the French Revolution, the club was founded in its current form in 2007, with the merger of Paris Basket Racing, from the city of Paris, and Levallois Sporting Club Basket, from the nearby commune of Levallois-Perret, and started to play with the name of Paris-Levallois Basket. The club retains all of the history and titles of Paris Basket Racing and Levallois Sporting Club Basket.

Despite beginning in the top-tier level of French basketball, the LNB Pro A, Paris-Levallois was relegated to the French second-tier level LNB Pro B, after finishing second from the bottom in the 2007–08 season. The club returned to the Pro A at the first opportunity, by claiming the league promotion from the Pro B in the 2008–09 season. Since then, the club has played in the top tier of French basketball.

On 5 July 2017, the club's board of directors agreed to change the name of the club to Levallois Metropolitans. On 4 July 2019, former NBA player Boris Diaw was announced as the club's new president, succeeding Jean-Pierre Aubry.

In the 2022–23 season, French young star Victor Wembanyama joined the team from ASVEL. Wenbanyama was widely projected to be the number one pick in the 2023 NBA draft. In October, the Metropolitans played exhibition games against the NBA G League Ignite in the United States, giving the club international exposure.

Arenas

Metropolitans 92 play their home games at the 4,000 seat Palais des sports Marcel Cerdan. Over the years, the club has also used the 4,200 seat Stade Pierre de Coubertin, as its home venue.

Honours and titles

Domestic competitions
French Federation Cup 
Winners (1): 2012–13
Match des Champions (French Supercup)
Winners (1): 2013
Tournoi de Toulouse
Winners (1): 2014

Season by season

Players

Current roster

Depth chart

Notable players

Head coaches
 Ilias Zouros: (2007–2008)
 Jean-Marc Dupraz: (2008, 2008–2011)
 Ron Stewart: (2008)
 Christophe Denis: (2011–2013)
 Gregor Beugnot: (2013–2015)
 Antoine Rigaudeau: (2015)
 Frédéric Fauthoux: (2015–2020)
 Jure Zdovc: (2020–2021)

See also
Paris Basket Racing
Levallois Sporting Club Basket

References

External links

 Official website
 Metropolitans 92 at Eurobasket.com

Basketball teams established in 2007
Basketball teams in Paris
Sport in Hauts-de-Seine
2007 establishments in France